Methyl cinnamate is the methyl ester of cinnamic acid and is a white or transparent solid with a strong, aromatic odor. It is found naturally in a variety of plants, including in fruits, like strawberry, and some culinary spices, such as Sichuan pepper and some varieties of basil. Eucalyptus olida has the highest known concentrations of methyl cinnamate (98%) with a 2–6% fresh weight yield in the leaf and twigs.

Methyl cinnamate is used in the flavor and perfume industries. The flavor is fruity and strawberry-like; and the odor is sweet, balsamic with fruity odor, reminiscent of cinnamon and strawberry.

It is known to attract males of various orchid bees, such as Aglae caerulea.

List of plants that contain the chemical 
 Eucalyptus olida 'Strawberry Gum'
 Ocotea quixos South American (Ecuadorian) Cinnamon, Ishpingo
 Ocimum americanum cv. Purple Lovingly (Querendona Morada)
 Ocimum americanum cv. Purple Castle (Castilla Morada)
 Ocimum americanum cv. Purple Long-legged (Zancona morada)
 Ocimum americanum cv. Clove (Clavo)
 Ocimum basilicum cv. Sweet Castle (Dulce de Castilla)
 Ocimum basilicum cv. White Compact (Blanca compacta)
 Ocimum basilicum cv. large green leaves
 Ocimum micranthum cv. Cinnamon (Canela)
 Ocimum minimum cv. Little Virgin (Virgen pequena)
 Ocimum minimum cv. Purple Virgin (Virgen morada)
 Ocimum sp. cv. Purple ruffle (Crespa morada)
 Ocimum sp. cv. White Ruffle (Crespa blanca)
 Stanhopea embreei, an orchid
 Vanilla

Toxicology and safety 
Moderately toxic by ingestion. The oral  for rats is 2610 mg/kg.
It is combustible as a liquid, and when heated to decomposition it emits acrid smoke and irritating fumes.

Compendial status
 Food Chemicals Codex

See also 
 Eucalyptus oil

References 

Cinnamate esters
Methyl esters
Flavors
Sweet-smelling chemicals

ja:ケイ皮酸メチル